Lo Fu Tau is a mountain on Lantau Island, Hong Kong, with a height of  above sea level.

Geology 

Lo Fu Tau is formed by Granitic rocks, unlike many of the tallest mountains on Lantau Island, such as Lantau Peak, which are formed by Volcanic rocks.

Geography 

Lo Fu Tau is the tallest mountain in the Discovery Bay area. It is a popular spot for hiking and trail running enthusiasts. To the south is Mui Wo, while to the east is Discovery Bay.

See also 
 List of mountains, peaks and hills in Hong Kong

References